Tammy Kim (born January 16, 1971) is an American politician and nonprofit executive. She currently serves as a member of the Irvine City Council in California. Kim is an elected member of the Central Committee for the Democratic Party in Orange County representing California's 68th State Assembly district.

Biography 
Kim was born in Seoul, S. Korea and immigrated with her family to the United States as an infant in 1971, eventually settling in Flint, Michigan where she spent her youth. Her family moved to Baltimore, MD right after her high school graduation and attended Michigan State University. Kim moved to Los Angeles in 1997 and then to Orange County in 2002. She settled in Irvine in 2005 with her son.

Career

Early career 
After moving to California in 1997, Kim spent the next several years working for companies including VMWare, EMC Corporation and CA Technologies, where she was VP of Global Talent Acquisition.

Nonprofit work 
In 2015, Kim founded the Korean American Center, an Irvine based nonprofit organization with a mission to help intergenerational Korean Americans connect with the greater community. In 2017, the Korean American Center began the process of merging with Korean Community Services, becoming one of the largest nonprofit organizations in Orange County serving the Asian American Pacific Islander community. In 2018, the Korean American Center received designation as the Irvine King Sejong Institute by the S. Korean government.    Additionally in the 2018, the organization was awarded a STARTALK grant by the National Security Agency for teaching Korean.

Political career 
Kim has been a supporter of various social issues regarding immigrants, working families, and under-represented linguistically isolated communities. She served as Chair of the Language Access Committee for the Orange County Registrar of Voters, Board Member of the Korean American Democratic Committee, and co-founder of Asian Americans in Action.

Kim competed for one of six open County Central Committee seats for the Democratic Party during the March 2020 Primary Election. Kim placed third out of eighteen candidates.  In March 2021, Kim was elected as Southern California Chair for the Asian Pacific Islander Caucus for the California Democratic Party.

Irvine City Council campaign 
In August 2019, Kim announced her candidacy for the 2020 Irvine City Council race. Kim was one of fourteen candidates competing for a nonpartisan election. She won in the general election on November 3, 2020 as a first time candidate. Kim set a record as the highest vote getter for a City Council race in the history of the city. Kim was sworn in on December 8, 2020 and her term ends in 2024. In January 2021, she was appointed by the City Council to serve a year-long term as Vice Mayor.

Asian American advocacy 
Prior to her election to the Irvine City Council, Kim participated in the  Asian American political movement in Orange County. Her election coincided with the rise of Anti-Asian hate in the United States. Kim brought awareness to "the intersection of racism and misogyny" after the Atlanta spa shootings.

Kim was the subject of a Xenophobic attack that was directed to her at a city council meeting in October 2021.

Electoral history

Irvine City Council – November 3, 2020 

*Incumbent

References

External links 
 Tammy Kim profile at City of Irvine
 
 
 http://koreanamericancenter.org/ (Korean American Center)
 https://www.aaaction.org/ (Asian Americans in Action)

1971 births
Living people
Kim, Tammy (Politician)
California politicians of Korean descent
California Democrats
21st-century American politicians
21st-century American women politicians
Women city councillors in California
American women of Korean descent in politics
Asian-American city council members
American politicians of Korean descent